Triplochiton is a genus of flowering plants in the family Malvaceae. It is a small genus of trees comprising tall tropical African trees with palmately lobed alternate leaves like those of the maple and being included in the Sterculiaceae subfamily of Malvaceae.

It is native to Tropical Africa, and found in the countries of Benin, Cameroon, Central African Republic, Congo, Equatorial Guinea, Gabon, Ghana, Guinea, Ivory Coast, Liberia, Nigeria, Sierra Leone, Togo, Zambia, Zaïre and Zimbabwe.

Known species
As accepted by Kew;
 Triplochiton scleroxylon  (African whitewood, Obeche and others)
 Triplochiton zambesiacus 

It was first described and published in Bot. Jahrb. Syst. Vol.28 on page 330 in 1900.

References

 
Malvaceae genera
Plants described in 1900
Flora of West Tropical Africa
Flora of West-Central Tropical Africa
Flora of Zambia
Flora of Zimbabwe